The following by elections took place in Jersey in 1999.

Senator By Election
February 1999

Results
Jerry Dorey 3,320
Paul Le Claire 1,811
Harry Cole 923
Geraint Jennings 440

Deputy By Election
St Helier Number One by election held April 1999 to replace Jerry Dorey who had been elected as Senator in February 1999.

Results
Paul Le Claire 236 votes
Jennifer Bridge 159 votes
John De Carteret 138 votes
Harry Cole 125 votes

References

By election 1999
Jersey
1999 elections in Europe